The men's 400 metres event at the 2003 Asian Athletics Championships was held in Manila, Philippines on September 20–21.

Medalists

Results

Heats

Final

References

2003 Asian Athletics Championships
400 metres at the Asian Athletics Championships